The  New Man  is a utopian concept that involves the creation of a new ideal human being or citizen replacing un-ideal human beings or citizens. The meaning of a New Man has widely varied and various alternatives have been suggested by a variety of religions and political ideologies.

Philosophical and religious versions

Baháʼí New Race of Men
Baháʼí literature states that training children in the world-embracing teachings of Bahá’u’lláh will cause a "truly new race of men" to emerge (“khalq-i-jadíd”, also translated as a “new creation” by Shoghi Effendi or as "spiritual rebirth"). The Bab in a letter, after expounding the purpose of his message, declares triumphantly “Wherefore are all part of a New Creation (khalq-i-jadíd) for We, we indeed originated that [new] creation…We did indeed initiate a new, eschatological creation.”  Abdu'l Baha describes how "after the coming of the spiritual springtime, all phenomena become imbued with the life of a new creation and are reformed in the process of a new genesis". It is prophesied that a time is approaching when a new race of men will have been raised up that is "incomparable in character", who will be tasked with "helping to rebuild the world with the aid and inspiration of the Bahá’í teachings" and who will "purge mankind" of its current "defilement" and corruption. Abdu'l Baha explains that only the only remedy to the current societal trend towards self-centered materialism is the power of a "new creation" where "the hearts and souls be revived" by "the breaths of the holy spirit". In the process of working towards the more just, unified society envisioned by Baha'u'llah, the Baha'i writings predict reactions of fear and dismay will emerge from some.

Baha'u'llah emphasises the selfless, altruistic nature of this new humanity that will come into being, writing that, "To be purged from defilement is to be cleansed of that which is injurious to man and detracteth from his high station—among which is to take undue pleasure in one’s own words and deeds, however worthy they may be. True peace and tranquillity will only be realized when every soul will have become the well-wisher of all mankind."
The Baháʼí writings also clarify that the initial response of fear will be short-lived, saying, "The fears and agitation which the revelation of this [God’s] law provokes in men's hearts should indeed be likened to the cries of the suckling babe weaned from his mother's milk, if ye be of them that perceive. Were men to discover the motivating purpose of God's Revelation, they would assuredly cast away their fears, and, with hearts filled with gratitude, rejoice with exceeding gladness
 Philosopher Ian Kluge identifies what he terms, "the process of revolution and transformation from within" as only a part of a wider process of radical change initiated in this current era of history, citing this quote from the Baha'i writings: the "whole creation was revolutionized and all that are in the heavens and all that are on earth were stirred to the depths. Through that Word the realities of all created things were shaken, were divided, separated, scattered, combined and reunited, disclosing entities of a new creation..."

The Baháʼí Faith also emphasises how this ideal human state is a distant goal towards which all must strive - 
“we can see that the process of recreating ourselves to be part of a new race of men will be an ongoing struggle for years to come”. Abdu'l Baha writes that, “We must strive unceasingly and without rest to accomplish the development of the spiritual nature in man, and endeavor with tireless energy to advance humanity toward the nobility of its true and intended station.”. He also stresses, however, that we have no claim to moral superiority over others: “Let us therefore be humble, without prejudices... Let us never say, “I am a believer but he is an infidel,” “I am near to God, whilst he is an outcast.” We can never know what will be the final judgment!”, further highlighting, "Who are we that we should judge? How shall we know who, in the sight of God, is the most upright man?"

Regarding this new state in humanity's evolution, it is also stated that "souls will arise and holy beings appear" who will "labor ceaselessly", "scatter in the world, and travel throughout all regions", "raise their voices in every assembly, and adorn and revive every gathering", "speak in every tongue, and interpret every hidden meaning", "reveal the mysteries of the Kingdom, and manifest unto everyone the signs of God", "perfume and revive the souls of men", and "reinvigorate the peoples and nations of the world". Baháʼí economist, John Huddleston, in discussing the three necessary dimensions required to achieve World Peace writes that “The first dimension is the creation of a new race of men: the adoption of the highest ethical standards by every man, woman, and child on the planet”.
In the Lights of Irfan annual publication, philosophy scholar Ian Kluge provides a comparative treatment of Baháʼí and Nietzschean concepts, including the Baháʼí new race of men and Nietzsche's Übermensch.

Nietzschean Übermensch

Philosopher Friedrich Nietzsche's concept of an Übermensch ("Overman") was that of a New Man who would be an example to humanity through an existentialist will to power that was vitalist and irrationalist in nature. Nietzsche developed the concept in response to his view of the herd mentality and inherent nihilism of Christianity, and the void in existential meaning that is realized with the death of God. Übermensch is the goal of humanity and the world-focused will of the Übermensch emerges as the new meaning of life on Earth, a norm-repudiating individual who overcomes himself and is the master in control of his impulses and passions.

Political versions

Liberal New Man
Thomas Paine and William Godwin believed that the spread of classical liberalism in France and the United States constituted the birth of a New Man and a new era.

Utopian socialist New Man
Utopian socialists such as Henri de Saint-Simon, Charles Fourier and Robert Owen saw a future Golden Age led by a New Man who would reconstruct society.

Communist New Man

Marxism postulates the development of a New Man and New Woman in a communist society following the values of a non-essential nature of the state and the importance of freely associated work for the affirmation of a person's humanity. This is in contrast to an innate personality opposing view which is counter-productive to the selfless collectivism that elevates austerities and discipline to true materialism in all its pejoratives and for the adherent to the self-regulating dynamic worker. Marxism does not see the New Man/Woman as a goal or prerequisite for achieving full communism, but rather as a product of the social conditions of pure communism. Che Guevara's essay "Socialism and man in Cuba" and Oscar Wilde's The Soul of Man under Socialism are two examples of the 'new man' archetype in socialist literature.

Fascist New Man
Fascism supports the creation of a New Man who is a strong-willed, dynamic archetype, a figure of direct action and bellicose violence. An anti-individualist, he is characterized by a sense of confidence and masculinity, quiet dignity and self-worth, determination, and authoritativeness. With a detachment from romantic love, family background and schooling, his worldview is romanticized, passionate, serious and realist, preoccupied with the honoring of fallen heroes, a strong belief in personal responsibility, national rebirth and renewal. He regards himself as one component of a disciplined mass that has shorn itself of individualism, party politics discrimination, and cohesive class orientation in favor of a united, para-militarist effort. One example of this was the idea of the Political Soldier, which was developed by the leaders of the Official National Front in the UK in the 1980s and became part of the ideology of the Third Position.

Transhumanist New Man
Transhumanism welcomes the creation of a literal new man by enhancements through cybernetics and other "human enhancements", and look to the singularity as that point in time when the new man arrives, his birthday if you will.  Scholar Klaus Vondung argues that Transhumanism represents the final revolution.  Others have made similar observations.

See also
 Confucian Junzi
 New Woman

References

Bahá'í belief and doctrine
Conceptions of self
Religious philosophical concepts
Political philosophy
Political movements in Europe
Utopian theory